The Crimea Pass is a mountain pass in North Wales, on the A470 road between Blaenau Ffestiniog and Dolwyddelan connecting the counties of Gwynedd and Conwy.

Geography 
At one time there was an inn at the summit of the pass, called the "Prince Llewellyn Inn" but it was popularly known as "the Crimea", because of its reputation for fights. The inn closed in 1881 because the police opposed the renewal of its licence and the justices thought that there was no need for the Inn when the railway to Ffestiniog was completed.

Industry 
In the mid 1870s, Owen Gethin Jones opened the Bwlch Gordduant quarry near the summit of the pass. The quarry was not a great success and it was sold to the owner of the Prince Llewellyn quarry in late 1876. There is a track above the road which follows the route of the old road across the pass, described as a cleverly constructed route with gradients appropriate for a time when horses were the source of power.

Name 
It takes its name from the Crimean War which was being fought about the time the road was opened, in 1854. The construction of the stone walls in the area was carried out by Russian prisoners of war captured at the battles of Inkerman and Balaclava.

Recent development 
In 2008 major highway improvement work on the A470 through the pass was completed, this included the downhill section to the north of the pass, and southwards down to Blaenau Ffestiniog.

References 

About the Russian prisoners of war

External links 
www.geograph.co.uk : photos of the Crimea Pass and surrounding area

Dolwyddelan
Ffestiniog
Mountain passes of Conwy County Borough
Roads in Conwy County Borough
Mountain passes of Gwynedd
Roads in Gwynedd
Mountain passes of Snowdonia
Roads in Snowdonia